The Fajã do Boi is a permanent debris field, built from the collapsing cliffs on the northern coast of the civil parish of Rosais, in the municipality of Velas, island of São Jorge, in the Portuguese archipelago of the Azores.

Located between the Fajã de João Dias and Fajã da Maria Pereira, there is no permanent human settlement on the fajã.

References

See also

 List of fajãs in the Azores

São Jorge Island
Faja Boi
Boi